Iain Wardlaw (born 29 June 1985, Dewsbury, Yorkshire, England) is a retired English-born first-class cricketer who played international cricket for Scotland.  A right-arm medium pacer and right-handed batsman, Wardlaw was contracted to Yorkshire County Cricket Club to the end of the 2012 season, and for whom he played four Twenty20 games, and one County Championship match in 2011.

Wardlaw joined Yorkshire in 2011, having played for Cleckheaton C.C. in the Bradford League.  He has played for the Yorkshire Second XI in the Second XI Championship, as well as appearing in his debut Twenty20 match for Yorkshire against Nottinghamshire in July 2011, when he took two wickets for 17 runs off 3.1 overs.
Wardlaw has since played three more Twenty20 matches for Yorkshire, although has yet to take another wicket, but his overall economy rate is 5.82 per over.

He made his first-class debut against Lancashire, in the Roses Match in July 2011, taking one wicket for 68 runs. Wardlaw was replaced in the Yorkshire side later in the match, when Tim Bresnan returned early from potential international duty.

In May 2015, Wardlaw announced that he would retire from international cricket to focus on a career in design.

References

1985 births
Living people
English cricketers
Yorkshire cricketers
Cricketers from Dewsbury
English cricketers of the 21st century
Scottish cricketers
Scotland Twenty20 International cricketers
Scotland One Day International cricketers
Cricketers at the 2015 Cricket World Cup